Kuttiyadi Saddle Dam (Malayalam:കുറ്റ്യാടി തടയണ) is a concrete gravity dam built across Karamanathodu river which is a tributary of Kabani river in Padinjarathara village of Wayanad district in Kerala, India. It is one of the six dams created as part of Kuttiyadi Augmentation scheme which augments the Banasurasagar reservoir. The dam was built and is maintained by Kerala State Electricity Board.

The Kuttiyadi Augmentation Scheme comprises a main dam known as Banasurasagar Dam, an earth fill dam and a concrete gravity spillway dam and six saddle dams namely, a) Kosani ( Earth fill dam) 13.8 m high b) Near Kottagiri ( Earth fill dam) 11.0 m high c) Kottagiri ( Earth fill dam) 14.5 m high d) Kuttiyadi ( Concrete dam) 16.5 m high e) Nayamoola ( Earth fill dam) 3.5 m high f)   Manjoora ( Earth fill dam) 4.0 m high. All the dams, except Kuttiady saddle, are earth fill dams. The Kuttiyadi saddle dam is a concrete dam. The spillway is located adjacent to the main dam at the right bank of the original river course. The water spread area at FRL / MWL is 12.77 km2. The catchment area of Banasurasagar Dam is 61.44 km2.

Specifications

Location	Latitude:11⁰35’56”N
Longitude:75⁰55’09”E	
Panchayath	Padinjarathara	
Village	Padinjarathara	
District	Wayanad	
River Basin	Kabani	
River	Karamanthodu	
Release from Dam to river	Kakkayam reservoir	
Taluk through which release flows	Koyilandy	
Spillway	Not provided
Year of completion	2004	
Name of Project	Kuttiady Augmentation Scheme	
Type of Project	Multi purpose

 Dam Features
Type of Dam : Concrete gravity
Classification	MH ( Medium Height)
Maximum Water Level (MWL)	EL 
Full Reservoir Level ( FRL)	EL 
Storage at FRL	209.25 Mm3
Height from deepest foundation	
Length	
Crest Level	Nil
River / Irrigation Outlet	1No. circular, 2.5m dia
Officers in charge & phone No.	Executive Engineer, Dam Safety Division No. V, Thariode
Assistant Executive Engineer, Dam Safety Sub Division

Installed capacity of the Project	231.75 MW	
Project Identification Code ( PIC) : KL29MH0048

Reservoir

The Gross Storage of Kuttiyadi Augmentation (Banasura sagar) Reservoir is 209 Mm3 and live storage 185 Mm3. The water stored in the reservoir is diverted to the reservoir of Kuttiyadi Hydro Electric Project through an interconnecting tunnel. The sill level of diversion tunnel at inlet is 750.83 m. The size and shape of tunnel is varying. It is varying from 2.35 m dia. circular lined tunnel for a length of 890m &2.85 m D shaped unlined tunnel for a length of 3873 m. Maximum diversion is11.6 m3/s. The diverted water is used for power generation from Kuttiyadi Power Station. FRL of the reservoir is 775.60 m. Top level of dam is 778.50 m. There are four radial gates, each of size 10.97 m x 9.20 m. Crest level of spillway is 767.00 m. Spillway capacity is 1664 m3/s. One lower level outlet is provided in the spillway structure at750.75 m of size 1.10 m X 1.75 m to release irrigation requirement.

References

Dams in Kerala
Dams completed in 2004